Germanos Karavangelis (also transliterated as Yermanos and Karavaggelis or Karavagelis, 1866–1935) was known for his service as Metropolitan Bishop of Kastoria and later Amaseia, Pontus. He was a member of the Hellenic Macedonian Committee and functioned as one of the major coordinators of the Greek Struggle for Macedonia.

Early life and career
Germanos Karavangelis was born Stylianos in 1866, in the village of Stipsi on Lesbos, then still under Ottoman rule. His father was a Psariot by the name of Chrysostomos and his mother was Maria. He had seven other siblings which included six sisters and one brother. When he was two years old, his family moved to Adramyttio, Asia-Minor (now Edremit, Turkey) where his father opened a shop. There, he attended school and was awarded a scholarship to study at the Theological School of Halki. He graduated in 1888, when he was ordained a Deacon and received the name Germanos. He then went on to study philosophy at the University of Leipzig and University of Bonn.

Germanos received a doctorate and went to Constantinople (now Istanbul, Turkey) where in 1891 he was assigned as a professor of Ecclesiastical History and Theology at the Theological School of Halki, where he had previously attended. As a professor, he wrote an encyclopedia of theology as well as scientific works and ecclesiastical discourses. In 1886, he was ordained a bishop with the title "Bishop of Charioupolis." At this new position, he fought for more Greek education and to curb anti-Greek sentiment. He assisted in sending Greek students abroad for higher education and was successful in recruiting 130 to the newly built Zografeion Lyceum. He also founded a girls' school by the name of "Karavangeli Girls' School." Karavangelis would also organize Sunday school classes and train new Clergymen.

From 1896 to 1900 he would serve as the Bishop of Pera (now Beyoğlu, Turkey).

Metropolitan of Kastoria and the Macedonian Struggle 
He was a Metropolitan Bishop of Kastoria, in communion with the Ecumenical Patriarchate of Constantinople, from 1900 until 1907, appointed in the name of the Greek state by the ambassador of Greece Nikolaos Mavrokordatos and was one of the main coordinators of the Greek Struggle for Macedonia that had an aim to defend the Greek and Greek Orthodox clerical interests against the Turks and the Bulgarians in then Ottoman Turkish-ruled Macedonia.

During the Macedonian struggle, Karavangelis directed the Greek response to supporters of the Bulgarian cause, the Internal Macedonian Revolutionary Organization (VMRO) and the Exarchate. At the time Karavangelis would travel in rural areas, and portrayed a fierce image of himself dressed with a dark raincoat, a bandolier on side of his shoulder and a gun on the other with a scarf tied around his clerical hat. He would assist in raising the morale of those aligned with the Patriarchate and in organizing armed bands to fight the Komitadjis. Karavangelis viewed Bulgarian influence within the area as a threat to Greek interests. He advocated for close relations and interaction among Turks and Greeks in the region, only in the context of when it was needed. Karavangelis viewed the rivalry between the Patriarchate and Exarchate as without religious dimensions and that the main concern preoccupying Balkan states was the post-Ottoman future of in the region after the empire was removed from Macedonia. Greece at the time sent more funds, men and arms to individuals such as Karavangelis in Macedonia. He was successful in returning many villages to the Patriarchate. 

Karavangelis organized armed groups composed mainly of Greek army officers and volunteers brought from Crete, the Peloponnese and other parts of Greek populated areas, and even worked with Pavlos Melas. He also recruited local Macedonian Greeks such as the chieftain Vangelis Strebreniotis from the village of Srebreni (now Asprogeia), and Konstantinos Kottas, a former member of IMRO, who in 1903, under the orders of Karavangelis, killed and beheaded Bulgarian revolutionary Lazar Poptraykov. The head was delivered to Karavangelis, which he placed on his desk and photographed it. 

In 1905, Karavangelis was present when Orthodox priest Kristo Negovani conducted the Divine Liturgy in the Albanian Tosk dialect. Karavangelis denounced the usage of Albanian in mass and under his orders had Negovani murdered. 

Karavangelis succeeded to strengthen Greek aspirations in Macedonia and thus helped the later incorporation of the major part of Macedonia by Greece in the Balkan Wars, for which he is praised as a national hero of the Greek Struggle for Macedonia ("Makedonomachos"). He is the author of the book of memoirs "The Macedonian Struggle".

Metropolitan of Amaseia and the Greco-Turkish War 
In 1907, following Bulgarian complaints and Russian pressure, Karavangelis was removed from his position by orders of the Sultan. He returned to Constantinople as a Synod until the collapse of the Diocese of Amaseia in January 1908. The Patriarch had requested that Karavangelis fill the recently vacated position, and so he became the Metropolitan of Amaseia, based in Sampsounta. There, he helped create schools in the most remote villages and established a high school for Greek education. He also assisted in the formation of armed groups to defend the Greek and Armenian population from Turkish aggression and persecution by the Young Turks. During massacres of local Armenians, Karavangelis along with Chrysanthos of Trebizond and Bishop Efthymios were able to save hundreds by hiding them in the Metropolitan Church and other Greek homes. Their efforts were recognized by a United States-based Armenian newspaper. For his actions, he was arrested and sent to Constantinople in 1917, where he would remain in prison for some time.

Following his release and the intensification of the Greco-Turkish War, he was sentenced to death in absentia by Mustafa Kemal's military tribunal in 1921. In the same year, Karavangelis proposed a Greek-Armenian-Kurdsish cooperation to subdue the Turkish Nationalist Movement, to the Greek Foreign Minister Georgios Baltatzis. This, however, would not come to flourishment. He was also large advocate for a Republic of Pontus which had made him an even larger target for the Turkish Nationalist forces.

In August 1922, he was in Bucharest for the coronation of Ferdinand I of Romania when disaster struck the Greeks. He got on the first ship to Constantinople, however he was not permitted to leave the steamer by the troops of Kemal. He was given a letter by the Patriarch which had notified him that if he left the boat he would be arrested and executed. The Patriarch appointed him Metropolitan of Ioannina for his own safety.

Later Career and Death 
In 1924, having been the Metropolitan of Ioannina for just over a year,  Karavangelis received a letter notifying him of his appointment of Metropolitan of the Ecumenical Patriarchate based in Budapest. He initially protested, however, he was not listened to. Many believe Karavangelis was replaced based on his Venizelist views and he considered this appointment a mockery and a form of exile. in April of the same year, the Patriarchate proposed a transfer of the headquarters from Budapest to Vienna. After his relocation, he worked tirelessly to revitalize Greek communities in Austria and neighbouring Hungary and Italy.

In 1926, he was angered by the decision of dictatorial government of Theodoros Pangalos to cut his salary by over half and was forced to rely on donations for basic needs.

On February 11, 1935, Germanos Karavangelis died of a heart attack in a hotel south of Vienna at 68 years of age. He was buried in Vienna despite his request to be buried in Greece in his will.

Legacy 
Germanos Karavangelis ranks among the most well known participants of the Greek struggle for Macedonia.

He was awarded Order of the White Eagle and Order of Saint Sava.

His memoirs from the Macedonian Struggle were published in 1959. In 1992, his account, along with those of other Makedonomachoi, was included in Figures of the Macedonian Struggle, together with the "Affairs of Pontus" by Germanos Karavangelis by Antigoni Bellou-Threpsiadis.

Also in 1959, the "Institute for the Study of the Balkan Peninsula", along with the "Society for Macedonian Studies" (both of Thessaloniki) arranged the transfer of his bones, first to Thessaloniki, then finally to Kastoria.

There are monuments dedicated to him in Kastoria.

See also
 Greek Struggle for Macedonia
 Pavlos Melas
  Амасийская митрополия. Википедии. ("Metropolis of Amasya".)

Notes

References

Sources
 Metropolitan of Kastoria Germanos Karavangelis. Foundation of the Hellenic World (FHW). Retrieved: 25 August 2014.
  Basil C. Gounaris. Social cleavages and national "awakening" in Ottoman Macedonia. East European Quarterly 29 (1995), 409–426.
 Basil C. Gounaris. Preachers of God and martyrs of the Nation: The politics of murder in ottoman Macedonia in the early 20th century. Balkanologie. Vol. IX, n° 1-2 | décembre 2005. Retrieved 27 August 2014.
 Basil C. Gounaris. "IX. National Claims, Conflicts and Developments in Macedonia, 1870-1912." In: Ioannis Koliopoulos (Ed.). The History of Macedonia. Thessaloniki: Museum of the Macedonian Struggle, 2007. pp. 183–213.
 Douglas Dakin. The Greek struggle in Macedonia, 1897-1913. Thessalonikē: Institute for Balkan Studies, 1966. 538 pp.
 
 Dimitris Livanios. "'Conquering the souls': nationalism and Greek guerrilla warfare in Ottoman Macedonia, 1904-1908." BMGS 23 (1999) 195–221.
 Julian Allan Brooks. "Shoot the Teacher!" Education and the Roots of the Macedonian Struggle." Thesis submitted in partial fulfillment of the requirements for the degree of Master of Arts. Simon Fraser University, Fall 2005. 191 pp.
 Lora Gerd. Russian Policy in the Orthodox East: The Patriarchate of Constantinople (1878-1914). De Gruyter Open, 2014. p. 10. 
 Olga Balytnikova-Rakitianskaia. Pontian Genocide. ORTHODOXY IN THE WORLD (www.pravmir.com). May 19, 2010, 14:45. Retrieved 27 August 2014.

Greek Sources

  Πάνος Ν. Αβραμόπουλος. Μητροπολίτης Γερμανός Καραβαγγέλης - Ο ρασοφόρος Ακρίτας. Romfea.gr. Σάββατο, 11 Μαΐου 2013. Retrieved 25 August 2014.
  Μητροπολίτης Καστορίας (1900-1908), Γερμανός Καραβαγγέλης. Ιερά Μητρόπολη Καστοριάς (I.M. Kastorias). Retrieved: 26 August 2014.
  ΜΗΤΡΟΠΟΛΙΤΗΣ ΓΕΡΜΑΝΟΣ ΚΑΡΑΒΑΓΓΕΛΗΣ (1866-1935). Stipsi, Lesvos. Retrieved: 25 August 2014.
  Καραβαγγέλης, Γερμανός. Academic Dictionaries and Encyclopedias - Dictionary of Greek. 2013. Retrieved 25 August 2014.
  Τσαγκάρης, Παναγιώτης (Θεολόγος). Γερμανός Καραβαγγέλης. Ο Παπαφλέσσας της Λέσβου.  Διακόνημα (Diakonima.gr). 18 Μαΐου 2010. Retrieved: 26 August 2014.
  Τάσος Αθ. Γριτσόπουλος. "Γερμανός. Ὁ Καραβαγγέλης." Θρησκευτική και Ηθική Εγκυκλοπαίδεια (ΘΗΕ). Τόμος 4 (Βυζάντιον-Διοκλής). Αθηναι – Αθαν. Μαρτινος, 1964. σελ. 400–402.
  Ψάρας, I., "O Γερμανός Kαραβαγγέλης και η ορθόδοξη Eλληνική Kοινότητα της Bενετίας (1924-1935)". Θησαυρίσματα 14 (1977), σελ. 275–287.

Related Sources

 Anastas Vangeli. Nation-building ancient Macedonian style: the origins and the effects of the so-called antiquization in Macedonia. Nationalities Papers: The Journal of Nationalism and Ethnicity, Volume 39, Issue 1, 2011. pp. 13–32.
 Panayiotis Diamadis. "Why Macedonia Matters." AHIF POLICY JOURNAL. Winter 2012–13. pp. 1–18.
 Victor Roudometof. Collective Memory, National Identity, and Ethnic Conflict: Greece, Bulgaria, and the Macedonian Question. Greenwood Publishing Group, 2002. 265 pp.

External links
 Leonidas Papazoglou. The Bishop of Kastoria Germanos Karavangelis with Turkish Officers and Soldiers. Museum Syndicate (MS). Retrieved: 27 August 2014.
 

1866 births
1935 deaths
20th-century Eastern Orthodox bishops
Bishops of the Ecumenical Patriarchate of Constantinople
Greek nationalists
Greeks from the Ottoman Empire
Greek people of the Macedonian Struggle
People from Lesbos
People from Edremit, Balıkesir
People sentenced to death in absentia
Recipients of the Order of the Medjidie
Recipients of the Order of St. Sava
Theological School of Halki alumni
Eastern Orthodox bishops in Greece
Greek people from the Ottoman Empire